Sausage factory may refer to:

A factory which manufactures sausage.
A legislative body, whose practices in creating law are often analogized to the goings on of a sausage factory.
The Sausage Factory, a show on MTV.
A slang name for an informal gathering of men, or with an overwhelming male predominance